Channel 10 is the third studio album by rap duo Capone-N-Noreaga, released on March 17, 2009. It was the duo's first album in nine years.

Track listing 

Sample credits
 "Bring it Here" contains a sample of "Tom Sawyer" by Rush.
 "S.O.R.E." contains a sample of "A Milli" performed by Lil Wayne & "Hello Brooklyn 2.0" performed by Jay-Z & Lil Wayne.

Singles

Follow the Dollar 
"Follow the Dollar" was the first single released from Channel 10. It is produced by The Alchemist. A music video was made and directed by Vid Arroyo, the music video was later shelved because the song failed to chart. The song was also featured on The Alchemist's EP The Alchemist's Cookbook.

Rotate 

"Rotate" was the lead single and the second released from Channel 10. It is produced by Ron Browz and features Ron Browz & Busta Rhymes.

Talk to Me, Big Time 
"Talk to Me, Big Time" or "Talk To Me (Big Tyme)" was the second single released from Channel 10. It was produced by The Inkredibles. The song failed to chart on any of the charts. The song has a music video that was released March 17 and was directed by Rik Cordero.

Charts

References 

2009 albums
Capone-N-Noreaga albums
Albums produced by the Alchemist (musician)
Albums produced by DJ Premier
Albums produced by Havoc (musician)
Albums produced by Ron Browz
Albums produced by the Inkredibles
SMC Recordings albums